Marv Hagedorn (born March 2, 1956, in Omak, Washington) has been Idaho's Veterans Division administrator since July 30, 2018.

Hagedorn was a Republican Idaho Senator representing District 14 from 2012 to 2018. He previously was an Idaho State Representative (2007–2012) by appointment of Governor Butch Otter in January 2007 representing District 20 in the B seat. Hagedorn ran for Idaho lieutenant governor in 2018 and placed third in the Republican primary.

Education
Hagedorn attended Pensacola Junior College and the University of Maryland.

Elections

2018 Lieutenant Governor's race 
On December 7, 2016, Hagedorn announced via Twitter that he planned to run for Lieutenant Governor of Idaho, becoming the first to announce.

Hagedorn drew 15.1% of the vote in the May 2018 primary election, placing him third among Republicans running for the office.

Sexual assault comments
On September 28, 2018, Hagedorn joked about sexual assault reporting on Twitter, stating "Two ladies have come forward describing how Kavanaugh actually intentionally flashed them with his genitalia uncovered while trying to urinate on them! Regardless that he was a newborn these 2 nurses have been scared & need an FBI investigation!" The tweet was met with backlash and criticism. In response, Hagedorn tweeted "What was meant as a bad joke was insensitive to many. I apologize. It was meant to make us ask ourselves, 'When is it too late to speak up?' Sexual trauma is serious and real, what we are witnessing is sending the message that it's OK not to speak up! It's not!" Hagedorn had to complete mandatory HR training following the incident. The Idaho Falls Post Register editorial board stated, "Hagedorn's poor apology shows he didn't grasp what was wrong with his tasteless joke in the first place."

References

External links
Marv Hagedorn at the Idaho Legislature
 

1956 births
Living people
Republican Party members of the Idaho House of Representatives
People from Meridian, Idaho
United States Navy officers
United States Navy sailors
People from Omak, Washington
Pensacola Junior College alumni
University of Maryland, College Park alumni
21st-century American politicians
State cabinet secretaries of Idaho